The Dickson Prize in Medicine and the Dickson Prize in Science were both established in 1969 by Joseph Z. Dickson and Agnes Fischer Dickson.

Dickson Prize in Medicine
The Dickson Prize in Medicine is awarded annually by the University of Pittsburgh and recognizes US citizens who have made "significant, progressive contributions" to medicine. The award includes $50,000, a bronze medal, and the Dickson Prize Lecture.  Receiving the Dickson Prize in Medicine is strongly correlated with receiving the Lasker Award and the Nobel Prize.

Recipients
Source: University of Pittsburgh

 1971 Earl W. Sutherland Jr.
 1972 Solomon A. Berson and Rosalyn S. Yalow
 1973 John H. Gibbon Jr.
 1974 Stephen W. Kuffler
 1975 Elizabeth F. Neufeld
 1976 Frank J. Dixon
 1977 Roger Guillemin
 1978 Paul Greengard
 1979 Bert W. O'Malley
 1980 David H. Hubel and Torsten N. Wiesel
 1981 Philip Leder
 1982 Francis H. Ruddle
 1983 Eric R. Kandel
 1984 Solomon H. Snyder
 1985 Robert C. Gallo
 1986 J. Michael Bishop
 1987 Elvin A. Kabat
 1988 Leroy E. Hood
 1989 Bernard Moss
 1990 Ernst Knobil
 1991 Phillip A. Sharp
 1992 Francis Sellers Collins
 1993 Stanley B. Prusiner
 1994 Bert Vogelstein
 1995 Ronald M. Evans
 1996 Philippa Marrack
 1997 Ed Harlow and Eric Steven Lander
 1998 Richard D. Klausner
 1999 James E. Darnell Jr.
 2000 Elizabeth H. Blackburn (Dickson Prize Lecture, April 13, 2000: "Telomere Capping and Cell Proliferation")
 2001 Robert G. Roeder (Dickson Prize Lecture, September 12, 2001: "Regulation of Transcription in Human Cells:  Complexities and Challenges")
 2002 C. David Allis (Dickson Prize Lecture, September 18, 2002: "Translating the Histone Code:  A Tale of Tails")
 2003 Susan L. Lindquist (Dickson Prize Lecture, September 24, 2003: "Protein Conformation as a Pathway to Understanding Cellular Processes, Disease and Bio-Inspired Materials")
 2004 Elaine Fuchs  (Dickson Prize Lecture, 2004: "Skin Stem Cells and Their Lineages")
 2005 Ronald W. Davis (Dickson Prize Lecture, 2005: "New Genomic Technology for Yeast Applied to Clinical Medicine")
 2006 Roger D. Kornberg (Dickson Prize Lecture, October 5, 2006: "Chromatin and Transcription")
 2007 Carol W. Greider (Dickson Prize Lecture, October 11, 2007: "Telomerase and the Consequences of Telomere Dysfunction")
 2008 Randy W. Schekman (Dickson Prize Lecture, "Dissecting the Secretion Process: From Basic Mechanism to Human Disease")
 2009 Victor Ambros (Dickson Prize Lecture, "MicroRNAs, from Model Organisms to Human Biology.")
 2010 Stephen J. Elledge
 2011 J. Craig Venter 
 2012 Brian J. Druker
 2013 Huda Y. Zoghbi (Dickson Prize Lecture, Thursday, October 3, 2013: "Rett Syndrome and MECP2 Disorders: From the Clinic to Genes and Neurobiology.")
 2014 Jeffrey I. Gordon
 2015 Karl Deisseroth
 2016 Jennifer Doudna
 2017 David M. Sabatini
 2018 Bonnie Bassler
 2019 Ruslan Medzhitov
 2020 James J. Collins

Dickson Prize in Science
The Dickson Prize in Science is awarded annually by Carnegie Mellon University and recognizes those who "have made the most progress in the scientific field in the United States for the year in question."  The award is dated by the year in which it was announced, which is often the year before the lecture occurs.

Recipients
Source: Carnegie Mellon University

 1971 Richard Bellman
 1972 George Palade and Keith Roberts Porter
 1973 
 1974 Elias J. Corey
 1975 David H. Geiger, civil engineering
 1975 – not awarded
 1977 – not awarded
 1978 John H. Sinfelt
 1979 Seymour Benzer
 1980 – not awarded
 1981 John Werner Cahn
 1982 – not awarded
 1983 Harden M. McConnell
 1983–84 Edward Fredkin
 1986 Norman Davidson
 1987 Benjamin Widom
 1988 Mitchell Feigenbaum
 1989 Joan A. Steitz
 1990 Richard E. Dickerson
 1991 F. Sherwood Rowland
 1992 David Botstein
 1993 Paul Lauterbur
 1994 Vera Rubin
 1995 Raymond Kurzweil
 1996 Leland Hartwell
 1997 
 1998 Walter Alvarez
 1999 Peter Shor, 25th recipient (Dickson Lecture, November 8, 1999, "Quantum Computing")
 2000 Howard Raiffa (Dickson Lecture, Tue. April 4, 2000: "Analytical Roots of a Decision Scientist"
 2001 Alexander Pines (Dickson Lecture, April 11, 2001: "Some Magnetic Moments"
 2002 Carver Mead (Dickson Lecture, March 19, 2002: "The Coming Revolution in Photography")
 2003 Robert Langer (Dickson Lecture, February 26, 2003: "Biomaterials And How They Will Change Our Lives")
 2004 Marc W. Kirschner (Dickson Lecture, March 30, 2004: "Timing the Inner Cell Cycle")
 2005 George Whitesides (Dickson Lecture, March 28, 2005: "Assumptions: If common assumptions about the modern world break down, then what could science and technology make happen?")
 2006 David Haussler (Dickson Lecture, March 9, 2006: "Ultraconserved elements, living fossil transposons, and rapid bursts of change: reconstructing the uneven evolutionary history of the human genome"
 2007 Jared Diamond (Dickson Lecture, March 26, 2007: "Collapse")
 2008 Jean Fréchet
 2009 Richard M. Karp
 2010 Saul Perlmutter (Dickson Lecture, March 17, 2010: "Stalking Dark Energy & the Mystery of the Accelerating Universe")
 2011 David A. Tirrell
 2011 Marvin L. Cohen (March 8, 2012: "Einstein, Condensed Matter Physics, Nanoscience & Superconductivity")
 2013 François M. M. Morel (March 12, 2013: "Ocean Acidification: Causes, Time Scales & Consequences")
 2014 Karl Deisseroth (February 3, 2014: "Illuminating the Brain")
 2015 Joseph M. DeSimone (February 16, 2015: "Breakthroughs in Imprint Lithography and 3D Additive Fabrication")
 2016 Judea Pearl (February 29, 2016 : "Science, Counterfactuals and Free Will") 
 2017 Chad A. Mirkin (February 2, 2017 : "Nanotechnology: Small Things Matter")
 2018 Jennifer Doudna (February 1, 2018: "CRISPR Systems: Nature's Toolkit for Genome Editing")
 2019 Emery N. Brown (January 31, 2019: "The Dynamics of the Unconscious Brain Under General Anesthesia") 
 2020 Geraldine Richmond (February 11, 2020: "Surf, Sink or Swim: Understanding Environmentally Important Processes at Water Surfaces")

Further reading
 Dickson Prize in Science at Carnegie Mellon University
 Dickson Prize in Medicine at University of Pittsburgh

See also

 List of medicine awards

Notes

Medicine awards
Awards established in 1969
Carnegie Mellon University